The Convention for Progress and the People (lit. Convention Party of the People; CPP or COPP) is a political party in Mali led by Mamadou Gakou.

History
The party was established and registered in November 1996. It put forward Soumana Sacko as its candidate in the 1997 presidential elections. Sacko finished third with 2% of the vote. The July 1997 parliamentary elections saw the party run in alliance with ADEMA. The alliance won a seat in Banamba in the second round of voting, with the seat taken by COPP.

The party nominated Gackou for the 2002 presidential elections, but he received just 0.7% of the vote. The party did not contest the 2013 parliamentary elections.

References

Political parties in Mali
Political parties established in 1996